Cine+ may refer to:

 Ciné+, a cable and satellite television channel owned by Canal+
 Cine+ (Greece), a digital terrestrial television station owned by ERT